Qaleh-ye Amiriyeh (also Romanized as Qal‘eh-ye Amīrīyeh and Qal‘eh Amīrīyeh; also known as Qal‘eh Ẕarrābī) is a village in Marbin-e Vosta Rural District, in the Central District of Khomeyni Shahr County, Isfahan Province, Iran. At the 2006 census, its population was 1,232, in 338 families.

References 

Populated places in Khomeyni Shahr County